The England national cricket team toured Australia and Ceylon in 1891–92.

The team, captained by W. G. Grace, was organised, financed and managed by Lord Sheffield, who later donated the Sheffield Shield to Australian domestic first-class cricket.

29 matches were played in total, of which 12 were won, two lost and 15 drawn. Eight of the games were first-class games, including three Tests against Australia. Australia won the Test series 2–1. It marked Australia's first Ashes victory, with the first eight being won by England.

The other five first-class matches were against New South Wales (twice), South Australia and Victoria (twice).

Test series summary
Australia won the Test series 2–1.

First Test

Second Test

Third Test

Players
England was captained by W. G. Grace and had Gregor MacGregor as its specialist wicket-keeper, the other players being Johnny Briggs, Bobby Peel, Andrew Stoddart, Bobby Abel, Maurice Read, George Lohmann, William Attewell, John Sharpe, George Bean and Hylton Philipson.

Australia was captained by Jack Blackham, who was also its wicket-keeper. Other players to represent Australia were Alec Bannerman, George Giffen, Jack Lyons, William Bruce, Charlie Turner, Harry Moses, Harry Trott, Bob McLeod, Harry Donnan, Sydney Callaway, Walter Giffen, Syd Gregory.

Ceylon
The team used Colombo as a stopover during its long sea voyage and played a match in October 1891 on Galle Face Green against a local side that was not first-class. This was the third time that an English cricket team had visited Ceylon.

References

External links
 Lord Sheffield's XI in Australia: Nov/Mar 1892 at Cricinfo
 Lord Sheffield's XI in Australia 1891/92 at CricketArchive

Further reading
 The Wisden Book of Test Cricket 1877-1978 by Bill Frindall
 WG Grace: His Life and Times by Eric Midwinter
 Wisden Cricketers Almanack 2006
 Comical cricket in rhyme & picture by Catch-a-catch. Melbourne 1891.

1891 in Ceylon
1891 in English cricket
1892 in English cricket
1891 in Australian cricket
1892 in Australian cricket
Australian cricket seasons from 1890–91 to 1917–18
Sri Lankan cricket seasons from 1880–81 to 1971–72
1891-92
1891
International cricket competitions from 1888–89 to 1918
1891-92